The Boxed Life is a double spoken word release by former Black Flag singer Henry Rollins. It also features Canadian journalist and radio show host Ian Bussières, better known as "The Oddball". It was originally released on cassette tape in 1993 on Imago Records and has also been released on CD.

Track listing
 All tracks written by Henry Rollins.
 Ian Bussières appears on Disc 1, Track 10 and Disc 2, Track 9.

Tape/Disc 1
 "Bone Tired" – 3:59
 "Airplanes" – 7:52
 "Airport Courtesy Phone" – 2:22
 "Jet Lag" – 3:40
 "Hating Someone's Guts-Pt. 1" – 5:48
 "Funny Guy" – 12:17
 "Love in Venice" – 5:37
 "Strength-Pt.1" – 11:11
 "Strength-Pt.2" – 23:03
 "The Odd Ball" – 1:26

Tape/Disc 2
 "Hating Someone's Guts-Pt.2" – 8:11'
 "Blues" – 4:01
 "Big Knowledge" – 14:43
 "Good Advice" – 13:07
 "Vacation in England" – 5:47
 "Condos" – 12:41
 "Trade Secrets" – 2:44
 "I Know You" – 5:34
 "The Odd Ball Gets a Big Laugh" – 0:54

Trivia
 The track "Love in Venice" features two poems Rollins wrote for the movie Ted & Venus (working title: Love in Venice) directed by Bud Cort.

1993 albums
Henry Rollins albums
Spoken word albums by American artists
Live spoken word albums